David with the Head of Goliath  is a painting by the Italian Baroque artist Caravaggio. It is housed in the Galleria Borghese, Rome. The painting, which was in the collection of Cardinal Scipione Borghese in 1650, has been dated as early as 1605 and as late as 1609–1610, with more recent scholars tending towards the former.

Caravaggio also treated this subject in a work dated c. 1607 in the Kunsthistorisches Museum in Vienna, and in an early work dated c. 1600 in the Prado in Madrid.

The immediate inspiration for Caravaggio was a work by a follower of Giorgione, c.1510, but Caravaggio captures the drama more effectively by having the head dangling from David's hand and dripped out blood, rather than resting on a ledge. The sword in David's hand carries an abbreviated inscription H-AS OS; this has been interpreted as an abbreviation of the Latin phrase humilitas occidit superbiam ("humility kills pride").

David is perturbed, "his expression mingling sadness and compassion." The decision to depict him as pensive rather than jubilant creates an unusual psychological bond between him and Goliath. This bond is further complicated by the fact that Caravaggio has depicted himself as Goliath, while the model for David is il suo Caravaggino ("his own little Caravaggio"). This most plausibly refers to Cecco del Caravaggio, the artist's studio assistant in Rome some years previously, recorded as the boy "who lay with him." No independent portraits of Cecco are known, making the identification impossible to verify, but "[a] sexual intimacy between David/model and Goliath/painter seems an inescapable conclusion, however, given that Caravaggio made David's sword appear to project upward, suggestively, between his legs and at an angle that echoes the diagonal linking of the protagonist's gaze to his victim." Alternatively, based on the portrait of Caravaggio done by Ottavio Leoni, this may be a double self-portrait. The young Caravaggio (his own little Caravaggio) wistfully holds the head of the adult Caravaggio. The wild and riotous behavior of the young Caravaggio essentially had destroyed his life as a mature adult, and he reflects with a familiar hermeticism on his own condition in a painting of a related religious subject.

The masterpiece in Rome is a "twin" of a second artwork on the same subject, David and Goliath, as reported in the inventory of the Galleria Borghese dated 1693, where is found that one was located in the first room, and the other in the fourth room. According to his biographer Bellori, the artwork had been commissioned to Caravaggio by Cardinal Scipione Borghese in 1606, a work that is possibly performed on a double easel, thus generating two twin masterpieces.

The biographical interest of the painting adds another layer of meaning to an already complex work, David and Goliath standing for Christ and Satan and the triumph of good over evil in orthodox Christian iconography of the period, and also as the cold-hearted beloved who "kills" and his lover according to contemporary literary conceit. An example of the genre can be seen in the contemporary Judith and Holofernes of Cristofano Allori in the Pitti Palace, where Allori depicts himself as Holofernes, although Caravaggio has depicted David not as cruel and indifferent but as deeply moved by Goliath's death.

If the painting was a gift to Cardinal Borghese, the papal official with the power to grant Caravaggio a pardon for murder, it can also be interpreted as a personal plea for mercy. "David with the Head of Goliath [thus] demonstrates Caravaggio's gift for distilling his own experiences into an original sacred imagery that transcends the personal to become a searing statement of the human condition." Here the complicated relationship between Caravaggio and his acquired child lover is on display. Not only is Caravaggio at this point a hunted murderer but also in a relationship with a man who Caravaggio procured and no doubt raped as a child. Caravaggio's self loathing is palpable.

See also
List of paintings by Caravaggio

Notes

References

External links

1600s paintings
Paintings by Caravaggio
Paintings in the Borghese Collection
Paintings about death
Paintings depicting David
Christian art about death
Self-portraits